Artesia is a populated place situated in Graham County, Arizona, United States.

History
Artesia's population was 106 in 1940.

References

Populated places in Graham County, Arizona